The Adon Papyrus, also known as the Aramaic Saqqara Papyrus is an Aramaic papyrus found in 1942 at Saqqara. It was first published in 1948 by André Dupont-Sommer.

It is currently in the Egyptian Museum (J. 86984=3483).

It is also known as KAI 266 and TAD A1.1.

Bibliography

Notes

1942 archaeological discoveries
Archaeological artifacts
10th-century BC works
Aramaic Egyptian papyri